Laura Les (born December 2, 1994), previously known as osno1, is an American music producer and singer-songwriter best known for being one half of experimental electronic duo 100 Gecs, alongside Dylan Brady.

Early life 
Laura Les grew up in a suburb of St. Louis, Missouri. As a teenager, she became interested in music while learning to play guitar. While attending Columbia College in Chicago, where she earned a degree in acoustic engineering, she began releasing music online under the moniker osno1.

Career 
In 2018, Les stopped using the osno1 moniker and released a third EP, Big Summer Jams 2018, under her own name. Big Summer Jams 2018 received positive responses from music critics, as Vice praised the EP's "debauched digital celebrations" while Tiny Mix Tapes called it "a blender of fun."

Les participated in a remix album of Katie Dey's album Mydata in early 2021. In March 2021, Les officially released her solo single "Haunted" following a positive reception from her fanbase after it was previously played during a virtual DJ set in 2020. The song was subsequently featured in season 2 of the HBO series Euphoria.

Personal life 
Les has cited being transgender as contributing to her exploration of different singing styles, including pitched-up "nightcore style" vocals, which she once used almost exclusively in her music due to her experiences with voice dysphoria. However, in a 2021 Pitchfork interview, she revealed she had begun taking vocal lessons and recording new 100 Gecs music with unpitched vocals, saying, "As I've been exploring my voice more, I'm like, 'I can do this.'"

She is married to cartoonist Gabe Howell. Les lived in Chicago from 2013 to 2020, then moved to Los Angeles with Howell to work more closely with Brady.

Discography

Extended plays

Compilation albums

Singles

Guest appearances

Songwriting and production credits

Remixes

As part of 100 Gecs 

 100 Gecs (2016)
 1000 Gecs (2019)
 1000 Gecs and the Tree of Clues (2020)
 Snake Eyes (2022)
 10000 Gecs (2023)

References 

1994 births
Living people
American women in electronic music
Musicians from St. Louis
Transgender women musicians
LGBT people from Missouri
American LGBT singers
Transgender singers
Hyperpop musicians